Exeter Book Riddle 25 (according to the numbering of the Anglo-Saxon Poetic Records) is one of the Old English riddles found in the later tenth-century Exeter Book. Suggested solutions have included Hemp, Leek, Onion, Rosehip, Mustard and Phallus, but the consensus is that the solution is Onion.

Text and translation 
As edited by Krapp and Dobbie and translated by Megan Cavell, the riddle reads:

Interpretation 
The riddle is noted for its double entendre, since to many readers the obvious solution to the riddle is 'penis'. It accordingly provides important evidence for attitudes to gender and sexuality in early medieval England.

Editions 

 Krapp, George Philip and Elliott Van Kirk Dobbie (eds), The Exeter Book, The Anglo-Saxon Poetic Records, 3 (New York: Columbia University Press, 1936), p. 193, https://web.archive.org/web/20181206091232/http://ota.ox.ac.uk/desc/3009.
 Williamson, Craig (ed.), The Old English Riddles of the Exeter Book (Chapel Hill: University of North Carolina Press, 1977).
 Muir, Bernard J. (ed.), The Exeter Anthology of Old English Poetry: An Edition of Exeter Dean and Chapter MS 3501, 2nd edn, 2 vols (Exeter: Exeter University Press, 2000).
 Foys, Martin et al. (eds.) Old English Poetry in Facsimile Project, (Madison, WI: Center for the History of Print and Digital Culture, 2019-). Online edition annotated and linked to digital facsimile, with a modern translation.

Recordings
 Michael D. C. Drout, 'Riddle 25', performed from the Anglo-Saxon Poetic Records edition (24 October 2007).

References 

Riddles
Old English literature
Old English poetry